Ernst Bach (10 May 1876 – 1 November 1929) was an Austrian actor and playwright. He made his debut as an actor at the Raimund Theater in Vienna in 1899.

In 1909 he started what was to become a 20-year partnership with Franz Arnold, with whom he wrote more than 20 plays, mainly farces and operettas. Their first hit play was The Spanish Fly in 1913. They went on to become one of the leading playwriting teams in Weimar Germany.

In 1917 he became the director of the Münchner Volkstheater in Munich, whilst continuing his writing partnership with Franz Arnold at Starnberg. He remained in Munich until his death in 1929.

Plays by Arnold and Bach
The Spanish Fly (1913)
Die schwebende Jungfrau (1916)
Die Fahrt ins Glück (1916, Operetta, music by Jean Gilbert)
Die bessere Hälfte (1917)
Fräulein Puck (1919, Vaudeville, music by Walter Kollo)
Das Jubiläum (1920)
Zwangseinquartierung (1920)
Der keusche Lebemann (1921)
Die Königin der Nacht (1921, Operetta, music by Walter Kollo)
Der kühne Schwimmer (1922)
Dolly (1923, Operetta, music by Hugo Hirsch)
Der Fürst von Pappenheim (1923, Operetta, music by Hugo Hirsch, English title: Toni)
Die vertagte Nacht (1924)
Der wahre Jakob (1924)
Die vertauschte Frau (1924, Operetta, music by Walter Kollo)
Olly-Polly (1925, Operetta, music by Walter Kollo)
Stöpsel (1926)
Hurra, ein Junge (1926)
Unter Geschäftsaufsicht (1927)
Arme Ritter (1928, Operetta, music by Walter Kollo)
Weekend im Paradies (1928)
Hulla Di Bulla (1929)

Arnold and Bach filmography

 The Whole Town's Talking (1926, based on the play The Whole Town's Talking by Anita Loos and John Emerson, which is based on Der keusche Lebemann) 
 The Prince of Pappenheim (1927, based on Der Fürst von Pappenheim) 
 A Warm Corner (1930, based on Stöpsel) 
 The True Jacob (1931, based on Der wahre Jakob) 
 Ex-Bad Boy (1931, based on the play The Whole Town's Talking by Anita Loos and John Emerson, which is based on Der keusche Lebemann) 
 The Soaring Maiden (1931, based on Die schwebende Jungfrau) 
 Weekend in Paradise (1931, based on Weekend im Paradies) 
 Business Under Distress (1931, based on Unter Geschäftsaufsicht) 
 Hooray, It's a Boy! (1931, based on Hurra, ein Junge) 
 The Spanish Fly (1931) 
 The Night Without Pause (1931, based on Der keusche Lebemann) 
 Wehe, wenn er losgelassen (1932, based on Unter Geschäftsaufsicht) 
 A Thousand for One Night (1933, based on Stöpsel) 
 Tisíc za jednu noc (1933, based on Stöpsel) 
 The Dangerous Game (1933, based on Unter Geschäftsaufsicht) 
 It's a Boy (1933, based on Hurra, ein Junge) 
 The Daring Swimmer (1934, based on Der kühne Schwimmer) 
 Oh, Daddy! (1935, based on Der wahre Jakob) 
 The Interrupted Honeymoon (1936, based on Die vertagte Nacht) 
 Oh, Such a Night! (1937, based on Die vertagte Nacht) 
 Pappas pojke (1937, based on The Spanish Fly) 
 One Night Apart (1950, based on Der wahre Jakob) 
 The Prince of Pappenheim (1952, based on Der Fürst von Pappenheim)  
 The Chaste Libertine (1952, based on Der keusche Lebemann)  
 Weekend in Paradise (1952, based on Weekend im Paradies) 
 Josef the Chaste (1953, based on Unter Geschäftsaufsicht) 
 The Postponed Wedding Night (1953, based on Die vertagte Nacht) 
 Hooray, It's a Boy! (1953, based on Hurra, ein Junge) 
 The Spanish Fly (1955) 
 The Daring Swimmer (1957, based on Der kühne Schwimmer) 
 The True Jacob (1960, based on Der wahre Jakob) 
 Ach Egon! (1961, based on Hurra, ein Junge) 
 To gelio vgike ap' ton Paradeiso (1963, based on Der keusche Lebemann)
 Den kyske levemand (1974, based on Der keusche Lebemann)

References

Bibliography
 Grange, William. Historical Dictionary of German Literature to 1945. Scarecrow Press, 2010.

External links
 

1876 births
1929 deaths
Austrian male stage actors
Austrian male dramatists and playwrights
20th-century Austrian dramatists and playwrights
People from Cheb
20th-century Austrian male actors
Male actors from the Austro-Hungarian Empire